Janardan Mishra (born 1 May 1956) is a member of the Bhartiya Janata Party and has won the 2014 Indian general elections and also the 2019 Indian general elections from the Rewa Lok Sabha constituency.

He is District President of the Bharatiya Janata Party and a Member of Parliament.

References

Living people
India MPs 2014–2019
People from Rewa, Madhya Pradesh
Lok Sabha members from Madhya Pradesh
Bharatiya Janata Party politicians from Madhya Pradesh
1956 births